Soloe fumipennis is a moth in the family Erebidae. It is found in Somalia.

External links
 Species info

Aganainae
Moths of Africa
Moths described in 1854